The 110th Street station was a local station on the demolished IRT Ninth Avenue Line in Manhattan, New York City. It had two levels. The lower level was built first and had two tracks and two side platforms and served local trains. The upper level was built as part of the Dual Contracts and had one track that served express trains that bypassed this station. It opened on June 3, 1903 and closed on June 11, 1940. The next southbound stop was 104th Street. The next northbound stop was 116th Street. This station was one of the few to have elevators as it was the highest station in the entire system, also this height reportedly made this station very popular for suicide jumps. The common suicides, combined with the line's 90° turns from Ninth Avenue (now Columbus Avenue) onto Eighth avenue (now Frederick Douglass Boulevard), subsequently earned the station, and the area of track around it, the nickname Suicide Curve.

According to Douglas (2004), the station was a popular site for suicide jumpers. In 1927, The New York Times reported that:

References

External links 
NYCsubway.org - The IRT Ninth Avenue Elevated Line-Polo Grounds Shuttle

IRT Ninth Avenue Line stations
Railway stations in the United States opened in 1903
Railway stations closed in 1940
Former elevated and subway stations in Manhattan
1903 establishments in New York City
1940 disestablishments in New York (state)